The Hubert Kairuki Memorial University (HKMU) is a private medical university in Dar es Salaam, Tanzania. It is an accredited university recognized by the government Tanzania through the Tanzania Commission for Universities (formerly known as the Higher Education Accreditation Council, HEAC). HKMU is a World Health Organization recognized medical university and appears in the International Medical Education Directory (IMED).

History
The university was established in 1997 by Hubert Mwombeki Kairuki (1940 - 1999), a Tanzanian obstetrician-gynecologist, educator and chairman of African evangelist enterprises. It was first named Mikocheni International University of Health Sciences (MIUHS), then Mikocheni International University, and received its present name in 1999. It was the first private university to be accredited in Tanzania, in June 2000.

Location
The HKMU campus is at plot No 322 Regent Estate in Mikocheni, some seven km from the Dar es Salaam city centre. HKMU has easy access to several major tourist attractions in Tanzania, including Bagamoyo, Saadani, Mikumi, the Selous game reserve, and Zanzibar.

Academics

HKMU offers degrees, diplomas and certificates in the following courses:

Undergraduate degree programmes
Doctor of Medicine (5 years) 
Bachelor of Science in Nursing (4 years)
Bachelor of Social Work (3 years)

Postgraduate programmes 

Master Of Medicine (MMED ) (3 years) in Paediatrics and Child Health
Master of Medicine in Obstetrics and Gynaecology
Master of Medicine in General Surgery
Master of Medicine in Internal Medicine
Master of Science in Public Health (MSCPH)

Diplomas
Diploma in Nursing (Pre-service programme) (3 years).
Diploma in Nursing for In Service programme (through e-learning) (2 years).
Diploma in Social Work

Certificates
Certificate in Nursing (2 years)
Certificate in Midwifery (6 Months)

See also
 Education in Tanzania

References

External links
 

Educational institutions established in 1997
Private universities in Tanzania
Hubert Kairuki Memorial University
1997 establishments in Tanzania